Antoine Marie Jean-Baptiste Roger, comte de Saint-Exupéry, simply known as Antoine de Saint-Exupéry (29 June 1900 – 31 July 1944), was a French writer, poet, journalist and pioneering aviator. He became a laureate of several of France's highest literary awards and also won the United States National Book Award. He is best remembered for his novella The Little Prince (Le Petit Prince) and for his lyrical aviation writings, including Wind, Sand and Stars and Night Flight.

Saint-Exupéry was a successful commercial pilot before World War II, working airmail routes in Europe, Africa, and South America. He joined the French Air Force at the start of the war, flying reconnaissance missions until France's armistice with Germany in 1940. After being demobilised by the French Air Force, he travelled to the United States to help persuade its government to enter the war against Nazi Germany.

Saint-Exupéry spent 28 months in America, during which he wrote three of his most important works, then joined the Free French Air Force in North Africa, even though he was far past the maximum age for such pilots and in declining health. He disappeared and is believed to have died while on a reconnaissance mission from Corsica over the Mediterranean on 31 July 1944. Although the wreckage of his plane was discovered off the coast of Marseille in 2000, the ultimate cause of the crash remains unknown.

Prior to the war, Saint-Exupéry had achieved fame in France as an aviator. His literary works posthumously boosted his stature to national hero status in France, including The Little Prince which has been translated into 300 languages. He earned further widespread recognition with international translations of his other works. His 1939 philosophical memoir Terre des hommes (titled Wind, Sand and Stars in English) became the name of an international humanitarian group; it was also used as the central theme of Expo 67 in Montreal, Quebec. His birthplace of Lyon also named its main airport and adjacent train station after him.

Youth and aviation

Saint-Exupéry was born in Lyon to an aristocratic Catholic family that could trace its lineage back several centuries, whose name ultimately references the 5th-century bishop Saint Exuperius. He was the third of five children of the Viscountess Marie de Fonscolombe and Viscount Jean de Saint-Exupéry (1863–1904). His father, an executive of the Le Soleil (The Sun) insurance brokerage, died of a stroke in the train station of La Foux before his son's fourth birthday. His father's death affected the entire family, transforming their status to that of "impoverished aristocrats".

Saint-Exupéry had three sisters and a younger blond-haired brother, François, who at age 15 died of rheumatic fever contracted while both were attending the Marianist College Villa St. Jean in Fribourg, Switzerland, during World War I. Saint-Exupéry attended to his brother, his closest confidant, beside François' death bed, and later wrote that François "...remained motionless for an instant. He did not cry out. He fell as gently as a [young] tree falls", imagery which would much later be recrafted into the climactic ending of The Little Prince. At the age of 17, now the only man in the family following the death of his brother, the young author was left as distraught as his mother and sisters, but he soon assumed the mantle of a protector and took to consoling them.

After twice failing his final exams at a preparatory Naval Academy, Saint-Exupéry entered the École des Beaux-Arts as an auditor to study architecture for 15 months, again without graduating, and then fell into the habit of accepting odd jobs. In 1921, Saint-Exupéry began his military service as a basic-rank soldier with the 2e Régiment de chasseurs à cheval (2nd Chasseurs à Cheval Regiment) and was sent to Neuhof, near Strasbourg. While there he took private flying lessons and the following year was offered a transfer from the French Army to the French Air Force. He received his pilot's wings after being posted to the 37th Fighter Regiment in Casablanca, Morocco.

Later, being reposted to the 34th Aviation Regiment at Le Bourget on the outskirts of Paris, and then experiencing the first of his many aircraft crashes, Saint-Exupéry bowed to the objections of the family of his fiancée, future novelist Louise Lévêque de Vilmorin, and left the air force to take an office job. The couple ultimately broke off their engagement and he worked at several more odd jobs without success over the next few years.

By 1926, Saint-Exupéry was flying again. He became one of the pioneers of international postal flight, in the days when aircraft had few instruments. Later he complained that those who flew the more advanced aircraft had become more like accountants than pilots. He worked for Aéropostale between Toulouse and Dakar, and then also became the airline stopover manager for the Cape Juby airfield in the Spanish zone of South Morocco, in the Sahara desert. His duties included negotiating the safe release of downed fliers taken hostage by Saharan tribes, a perilous task that earned him his first Légion d'honneur from the French Government.

In 1929, Saint-Exupéry was transferred to Argentina, where he was appointed director of the Aeroposta Argentina airline. He lived in Buenos Aires, in the Galería Güemes building. He surveyed new air routes across South America, negotiated agreements, and even occasionally flew the airmail as well as search missions looking for downed fliers. This period of his life is briefly explored in Wings of Courage, an IMAX film by French director Jean-Jacques Annaud.

Writing career

Saint-Exupéry's first novella, L'Aviateur (The Aviator), was published in 1926 in a short-lived literary magazine Le Navire d'Argent (The Silver Ship). In 1929, his first book, Courrier Sud (Southern Mail) was published; his career as an aviator and journalist was about to begin. That same year, Saint-Exupéry flew the Casablanca—Dakar route.

The 1931 publication of Vol de nuit (Night Flight) established Saint-Exupéry as a rising star in the literary world. It was the first of his major works to gain widespread acclaim and won the prix Femina. The novel mirrored his experiences as a mail pilot and director of the Aeroposta Argentina airline, based in Buenos Aires, Argentina. That same year, at Grasse, Saint-Exupéry married Consuelo Suncin (née Suncín Sandoval), a once-divorced, once-widowed Salvadoran writer and artist, who possessed a bohemian spirit and a "viper's tongue".

Saint-Exupéry, thoroughly enchanted by the diminutive woman, would leave and then return to her many times—she was both his muse and, over the long term, the source of much of his angst. It was a stormy union, with Saint-Exupéry travelling frequently and indulging in numerous affairs, most notably with the Frenchwoman Hélène de Vogüé (1908–2003), known as "Nelly" and referred to as "Madame de B." in Saint-Exupéry biographies. Vogüé became Saint-Exupéry's literary executrix after his death and also wrote her own Saint-Exupéry biography under a pseudonym, Pierre Chevrier.

Saint-Exupéry continued to write until the spring of 1943, when he left the United States with American troops bound for North Africa in the Second World War.

Desert crash

On 30 December 1935, at 2:45 am, after 19 hours and 44 minutes in the air, Saint-Exupéry, along with his mechanic-navigator André Prévot, crashed in the Libyan desert, during an attempt to break the speed record in a Paris-to-Saigon air race and win a prize of 150,000 francs. The crash site is thought to have been near the Wadi Natrun valley, close to the Nile Delta.

Both Saint-Exupéry and Prévot miraculously survived the crash, only to face rapid dehydration in the intense desert heat. Their maps were primitive and ambiguous, leaving them with no idea of their location. Lost among the sand dunes, their sole supplies consisted of some grapes, two oranges, a madeleine, a pint of coffee in a battered thermos, and a half-pint of white wine in another. They also had with them a small store of medicine: "a hundred grammes of ninety percent alcohol, the same of pure ether, and a small bottle of iodine."

The pair had only one day worth of fluids. They both saw mirages and experienced auditory hallucinations, which were quickly followed by more vivid hallucinations. By the second and third day, they were so dehydrated that they stopped sweating. On the fourth day, a Bedouin on a camel discovered them and administered a native rehydration treatment that saved their lives. The near brush with death would figure prominently in his 1939 memoir, Wind, Sand and Stars, winner of several awards. Saint-Exupéry's classic novella The Little Prince, which begins with a pilot being stranded in the desert, is, in part, a reference to this experience.

Canadian and American sojourn and The Little Prince

Following the German invasion of France in 1940, Saint-Exupéry flew a Bloch MB.174 with the Groupe de reconnaissance II/33 reconnaissance squadron of the Armée de l'Air.

After France's armistice with Germany, Saint-Exupéry went into exile in North America, escaping through Portugal. He stayed in Estoril, at the Hotel Palácio, between 28 November and 20 December 1940. He described his impressions of his stay in Lettre à un Otage. On the same day that he checked out, he boarded the S.S. Siboney and arrived in New York City on the last day of 1940, with the intention of convincing the U.S. to enter the conflict against Nazi Germany quickly. On 14 January 1941, at a Hotel Astor author luncheon attended by approximately 1,500, he belatedly received his National Book Award for Wind, Sand and Stars, won a year earlier while he was occupied witnessing the destruction of the French Army. Consuelo followed him to New York City several months later after a chaotic migration to the southern French town of Oppède, where she lived in an artist's commune, the basis of her autobiography, Kingdom of the Rocks: Memories of Oppède.

Between January 1941 and April 1943, the Saint-Exupérys lived in New York City's Central Park South in twin penthouse apartments, as well as The Bevin House mansion in Asharoken on Long Island, New York and a townhouse on Beekman Place in Manhattan.

Saint-Exupéry and Charles Lindbergh both became P-38 pilots during World War II, with Lindbergh fighting in the Pacific War, and with Saint-Exupéry fighting and dying over the Mediterranean.

It was after Saint-Exupéry's arrival in the United States that the author adopted the hyphen within his surname, as he was annoyed with Americans addressing him as "Mr. Exupéry". It was also during this period that he authored Pilote de guerre (Flight to Arras), which earned widespread acclaim, and Lettre à un otage (Letter to a Hostage), dedicated to the 40 million French living under Nazi oppression, plus numerous shorter pieces in support of France. The Saint-Exupérys also resided in Quebec City, Canada for several weeks during the late spring of 1942, during which time they met a precocious eight-year-old boy with blond curly hair, Thomas, the son of philosopher Charles De Koninck, with whom the Saint-Exupérys resided.

After he returned from his stay in Quebec, which had been fraught with illness and stress, the French wife of one of his publishers helped persuade Saint-Exupéry to produce a children's book, hoping to calm his nerves and also compete with the new series of Mary Poppins stories by P.L. Travers. Saint-Exupéry wrote and illustrated The Little Prince in New York City and the village of Asharoken in mid-to-late 1942, with the manuscript being completed in October. It would be first published months later in early 1943 in both English and French in the United States, and would only later appear in his native homeland posthumously after the liberation of France, as his works had been banned by the collaborationist Vichy Regime.

Return to war
In April 1943, following his 27 months in North America, Saint-Exupéry departed with an American military convoy for Algiers, to fly with the Free French Air Force and fight with the Allies in a Mediterranean-based squadron. Then 43, soon to be promoted to the rank of commandant (major), he was far older than most men in operational units. Although eight years over the age limit for such pilots, he had petitioned endlessly for an exemption which had finally been approved by General Dwight Eisenhower. However, Saint-Exupéry had been suffering pain and immobility due to his many previous crash injuries, to the extent that he could not dress himself in his own flight suit or even turn his head leftwards to check for enemy aircraft.

Saint-Exupéry was assigned with a number of other pilots to his former unit, renamed Groupe de reconnaissance 2/33 "Savoie", flying P-38 Lightnings, which an officer described as "war-weary, non-airworthy craft". The Lightnings were also more sophisticated than models he previously flew, requiring him to undertake seven weeks of stringent training before his first mission. After wrecking a P-38 through engine failure on his second mission, he was grounded for eight months, but was then later reinstated to flight duty on the personal intervention of General Ira Eaker, Deputy Commander of the U.S. Army Air Forces.

After Saint-Exupéry resumed flying, he also returned to his longtime habit of reading and writing while flying his single-seat Lockheed F-5B (a specially configured P-38 reconnaissance variant). His prodigious studies of literature gripped him and on occasion, he continued his readings of literary works until moments before takeoff, with mechanics having warmed up and tested his aircraft for him in preparation for his flight. On one flight, to the chagrin of his colleagues awaiting his arrival, he circled the airport for an hour after returning, so that he could finish reading a novel. Saint-Exupéry frequently flew with a lined notebook (carnet) during his long solitary flights and some of his philosophical writings were created during such periods when he could reflect on the world below him.

Disappearance
Prior to his return to flight duty with his squadron in North Africa, the collaborationist Vichy Regime unilaterally promoted Saint-Exupéry as one of its members – quite a shock to the author. Subsequently, French General (later French President) Charles de Gaulle, whom Saint-Exupéry held in low regard, publicly implied that the author-pilot was supporting Germany. Depressed at this, he began to drink heavily. Additionally, his health, both physically and mentally, had been deteriorating. Saint-Exupéry was said to be intermittently subject to depression and there was discussion of taking him off flying status.

Saint-Exupéry's last assigned reconnaissance mission was to collect intelligence on German troop movements in and around the Rhone Valley preceding the Allied invasion of southern France ("Operation Dragoon"). Although he had been reinstated to his old squadron with the provision that he was to fly only five missions, on 31 July 1944, he took off in an unarmed P-38 on his ninth reconnaissance mission from an airbase on Corsica. To the great alarm of his squadron compatriots, he did not return, vanishing without a trace. Word of his disappearance soon spread across the literary world and then it spread into international headlines.

Discovery at sea

In September 1998, to the east of Riou Island (south of Marseille) a fishermen found a silver identity bracelet bearing the names of Saint-Exupéry, his wife Consuelo, and his American publisher, Reynal & Hitchcock. The bracelet was hooked to a piece of fabric, presumably from his flight suit. Announcement of the discovery was an emotional event in France, where Saint-Exupéry was a national icon, and some disputed its authenticity because it was found far from his intended flight path, implying that the aircraft might not have been shot down.

In May 2000 a diver found debris from a Lockheed P-38 Lightning submerged off the coast of Marseille, near where the bracelet was found. The discovery galvanized the country, which had conducted searches for his aircraft and speculated on Saint-Exupéry's fate for decades. After a two-year delay which was imposed by the French government, the remnants of the aircraft were recovered in October 2003.
In 2004, French officials and investigators from the French Underwater Archaeological Department officially confirmed that the remnants of the crash wreckage were, indeed, from Saint-Exupéry's Lockheed F-5B.

No marks or holes attributable to gunfire were found; however, that was not considered significant as only a small portion of the aircraft was recovered. In June 2004, the fragments were given to the Air and Space Museum in Le Bourget, Paris, where Saint-Exupéry's life is commemorated in a special exhibit.

Speculations in 1948, 1972, and 2008
In 1948, former Luftwaffe telegrapher Rev. Hermann Korth published his war logs, noting an incident that occurred at around noon on 31 July 1944 in which a Focke-Wulf Fw 190 downed a P-38 Lightning. Korth's account ostensibly supported a shoot-down hypothesis for Saint-Exupéry. The veracity of his log, however, was met with skepticism, because it could have described a P-38 which was flown by Second Lieutenant Gene Meredith on 30 July, downed south of Nice.

In 1972, the German magazine Der Landser quoted a letter from Luftwaffe reconnaissance pilot Robert Heichele, in which he purportedly claimed to have shot down a P-38 on 31 July 1944. His account, corroborated by a spotter, seemingly supported a shoot-down hypothesis of Saint-Exupéry. However, Heichele's account was met with skepticism, because he described flying a Focke-Wulf Fw 190 D-9, a variant which had not yet entered Luftwaffe service.

In the lists which are held by the Bundesarchiv-Militärarchiv, no victory was credited to Heichele or his unit in either July or August 1944, and the decrypted report of the day's reconnaissance does not include any flights by 2./NAG 13's Fw 190s. Heichele was shot down on 16 August 1944 and died five days later.

In 2008, a French journalist from La Provence, who was investigating Saint-Exupéry's death, contacted former Luftwaffe pilots who flew in the area of Marseille, eventually getting an account from Horst Rippert (1922—2013). (Rippert was the older brother of the famous bass singer Ivan Rebroff, who was born in Berlin as Hans-Rolf Rippert.) In his memoirs, Horst Rippert, an admirer of Saint-Exupéry's books, expressed both fears and doubts that he was responsible, but in 2003 he stated that he became certain that he was responsible when he learned the location of Saint-Exupéry's wreckage. Rippert claimed to have reported the kill over his radio, but there are no surviving records to verify this account.

Rippert's account, as it is discussed in two French and German books, was met with both publicity and skepticism. Luftwaffe comrades expressed doubts in Rippert's claim, given that he held it private for 64 years. Very little German documentation survived the war, and contemporary archival sources, consisting mostly of Allied intercepts of Luftwaffe signals, offer no evidence to directly verify Rippert's claim. The entry and exit points of Saint-Exupéry's mission were likely near Cannes, yet his wreckage was discovered South of Marseille.

Though it is possible that German fighters could have intercepted, or at least altered, Saint-Exupéry's flight path, the cause of his death remains unknown, and Rippert's account remains one hypothesis among many.

Literary works
While not precisely autobiographical, much of Saint-Exupéry's work is inspired by his experiences as a pilot. One notable example is his novella, The Little Prince, a poetic tale self-illustrated in watercolours in which a pilot stranded in the desert meets a young prince fallen to Earth from a tiny asteroid. "His most popular work, The Little Prince was partially based upon a crash he and his navigator survived in the Libyan desert. They were stranded and dehydrated for four days, nearing death when they miraculously stumbled upon a Bedouin who gave them water. Saint Exupery would later write in Wind, Sand and Stars that the Bedouin saved their lives and gave them "charity and magnanimity [by] bearing the gift of water." The Little Prince is a philosophical story, including societal criticism, remarking on the strangeness of the adult world. One biographer wrote of his most famous work: "Rarely have an author and a character been so intimately bound together as Antoine de Saint-Exupéry and his Little Prince," and remarking of their dual fates, "...the two remain tangled together, twin innocents who fell from the sky."

Saint-Exupéry's notable literary works (published English translations in parentheses) include:
 L'Aviateur (1926) (The Aviator, in the anthology A Sense of Life)
 Courrier sud (1929) (Southern Mail) – made as a movie in French
 Vol de nuit (1931) (Night Flight) – winner of the full prix Femina and made twice as a movie and a TV film, both in English
The Wild Garden (1938) – Limited to one thousand copies privately printed for the friends of the author and his publishers as a New Year's Greeting. The story is taken from the forthcoming book, Wind, Sand and Stars, to be published in the spring of 1939.
 Terre des hommes (1939) – winner of the Grand Prix du roman de l'Académie française
 Wind, Sand and Stars (simultaneous distinct English version) – winner of the U.S. National Book Award
 Pilote de guerre (1942) (titled in English as: Flight to Arras) – winner of the Grand Prix Littéraire de l'Aéro-Club de France
 Le petit prince (1943) (The Little Prince), posthumous in France – translated into more than 250 languages and dialects and among the top four selling books in the world; made as both movies and TV films in a number of languages, and adapted to numerous other media in many languages
 Lettre à un otage (1944) (Letter to a Hostage, posthumous in English)

Published posthumously
 Citadelle (1948) (titled in English: as The Wisdom of the Sands) – winner of the Prix des Ambassadeurs
 Lettres à une jeune fille (1950)
 Lettres de jeunesse, 1923–1931 (1953)
 Lettres à l'amie inventée (1953)
 Carnets (1953)
 Lettres à sa mère (1955)
 Un sens à la vie (1956), (A Sense of Life)
 Lettres de Saint-Exupéry (1960)
 Lettres aux américains (1960)
 Écrits de guerre, 1939–1944 (1982) (Wartime Writings, 1939–1944)
 Manon, danseuse (2007)
 Lettres à l'inconnue (1992)

Other works
During the 1930s, Saint-Exupéry led a mixed life as an aviator, journalist, author and publicist for Air France, Aéropostale's successor. His journalistic writings for Paris-Soir, Marianne and other newspapers covered events in Indochina and the Far East (1934), the Mediterranean, Soviet Union and Moscow (1935), and the Spanish Civil War (1936–1937). Saint-Exupéry additionally wrote a number of shorter pieces, essays and commentaries for various other newspapers and magazines.

Notable among those during World War II was "An Open Letter to Frenchmen Everywhere", which was highly controversial in its attempt to rally support for France against Nazi oppression at a time when the French were sharply divided between support of the Gaullists and Vichy factions. It was published in The New York Times Magazine in November 1942, in its original French in Le Canada, de Montréal at the same time, and in Pour la Victoire the following month. Other shorter pieces include (in French except where translated by others to English):
 "Une Lettre de M. de Saint-Exupéry", Les Annales politiques et littéraires, 15 December 1931; (extracts from a letter written to Benjamin Crémieux).
 Preface of Destin de Le Brix by José le Boucher, Nouvelle Librairie Française, 1932.
 Preface of Grandeur et servitude de l'aviation by Maurice Bourdet, Paris: Editions Corrêa, 1933.
 "Reflections on War", translated from Paris-Soir and published in Living Age, November 1938, pp. 225–228.
 Preface of Vent se lève (French translation of Listen! The Wind) by Anne Morrow Lindbergh, Paris: Editions Corrêa, 1939.
 Preface of Pilotes d'essai by Jean-Marie Conty, Paris: Edition Spes, 1939.
 "Books I Remember", Harper's Bazaar, April 1941.
 "Letter to Young Americans", The American High School Weekly, 25 May 1942, pp. 17–18.
 "Voulez-vous, Français, vous reconcilier?", Le Canada, de Montreal, 30 November 1942.
 "L'Homme et les éléments", Confluences, 1947, Vol. VII, pp. 12–14 (issue dedicated to Saint-Exupéry; originally published in English in 1939 as 'The Elements' in Wind, Sand and Stars).
 "Lettre Inédite au General C", Le Figaro Littéraire, 10 April 1948 (posthumous).
 "Seigneur Berbère", La Table Ronde, No. 7, July 1948 (posthumous).

Censorship and publication bans
Pilote de guerre (Flight To Arras), which describes the German invasion of France, was slightly censored when it was released in its original French during wartime in his homeland, due to the removal of a derogatory remark which was made about Hitler (which the French publisher Gallimard failed to reinsert in subsequent editions after World War II). However, shortly after the book's wartime release in France, Nazi appeasers and Vichy supporters objected to its praise of one of Saint-Exupéry's squadron colleagues, Captain Jean Israël, who was portrayed as being amongst the squadron's bravest defenders during the Battle of France.

In support of their German occupiers and masters, Vichy authorities attacked the author as a defender of Jews (in racist terms) leading to the praised book being banned in France, along with prohibitions against further printings of Saint-Exupéry's other works. Prior to France's liberation new printings of Saint-Exupéry's works were made available there only by means of covert print runs, such as that of February 1943 when 1,000 copies of an underground version of Pilote de guerre were printed in Lyon.

A further complication occurred due to Saint-Exupéry's and others' view of General Charles de Gaulle, who was held in low regard. Early in the war, de Gaulle became the leader of the Free French Forces in exile, with his headquarters in London. Even though both men were working to free France from Nazi occupation, Saint-Exupéry viewed de Gaulle with apprehension as a possible post-war dictator, and he consequently provided no public support to the General. In response, de Gaulle struck back at the author by implying that the author was a supporter of Germany, and he then had his literary works banned in France's North African colonies. Saint-Exupéry's writings were, with irony, banned simultaneously in both occupied France and the territory which was controlled by Free France.

Extension of copyrights in France
Due to Saint-Exupéry's wartime death, the French government awarded his estate the civil code designation Mort pour la France (English: Died for France) in 1948. Amongst the law's provisions is an increase of 30 years to the duration of the original copyright's duration of 70 years; thus most of Saint-Exupéry's creative works will not fall out of copyright status in France for an extra 30 years.

Honours and legacy

 Saint-Exupéry is commemorated with an inscription in the Panthéon in Paris, France's repository of historical greats. Although his body was never identified, his name was added to the Panthéon in November 1967 by a French legislative act. The inscription reads: "A LA MÉMOIRE DE • ANTOINE DE SAINT EXUPERY • POÈTE ROMANCIER AVIATEUR • DISPARU AU COURS D'UNE MISSION • DE RECONNAISSANCE AÉRIENNE • LE 31 JUILLET 1944" (To the memory of Antoine de Saint Exupery, poet, novelist, aviator, missing during an aerial reconnaissance mission, 31 July 1944). Amongst other honours from France, he was named a Chevalier de la Légion d'honneur in April 1930 and was promoted to an Officier de la Légion d'honneur in January 1939. He was awarded the Croix de Guerre in 1940 and was posthumously awarded the Croix de Guerre avec Palme in 1944.
 From 1993 until the introduction of the euro, Saint-Exupéry's portrait and several of his drawings from The Little Prince appeared on France's 50-franc banknote. The French Government also later minted a 100-franc commemorative coin, with Saint-Exupéry on its obverse side, and the Little Prince on its reverse. Brass-plated souvenir Monnaie de Paris commemorative medallions were also created in his honour, depicting the pilot's portrait over the P-38 Lightning aircraft he last flew.
 In 1999, the Government of Quebec and Quebec City added a historical marker to the family home of Charles De Koninck, head of the Department of Philosophy at Université Laval, where the Saint-Exupérys stayed while lecturing in Canada for several weeks during May and June 1942.
 In 2000, on the centenary of his birth, in the city where he was born, he was memorialised when the Lyon Satolas Airport was renamed the Lyon-Saint Exupéry Airport. Lyon's TGV bullet train station was also renamed as Gare de Lyon Saint-Exupéry. The author is additionally commemorated by a statue in Lyon, depicting a seated Saint-Exupéry with the little prince standing behind him.
 A street in Montesson, a suburb of Paris, is named for him as Rue Antoine de Saint-Exupéry.

Museums and exhibits

Museum exhibits, exhibitions and theme villages dedicated to both him and his diminutive Little Prince have been created in Le Bourget, Paris and other locations in France, as well as in the Republic of South Korea, Japan, Morocco, Brazil, the United States and Canada.
 The Air and Space Museum at Paris's Le Bourget Airport, in cooperation with The Estate of Saint-Exupéry-d'Agay, has created a permanent exhibit of 300 m2 dedicated to the author, pilot, person and humanist. The Espace Saint Exupéry exhibit, officially inaugurated in 2006 on the anniversary of the aviator's birthday, traces each stage of his life as an airmail pioneer, eclectic intellectual artist, and military pilot. It includes artifacts from his life: photographs, his drawings, letters, some of his original notebooks (carnets) he scribbled in voluminously and which were later published posthumously, plus remnants of the unarmed P-38 he flew on his last reconnaissance mission and which were recovered from the Mediterranean Sea.
 In Tarfaya, Morocco, next to the Cape Juby airfield where Saint-Exupéry was based as an Aéropostale airmail pilot/station manager, Antoine de Saint-Exupery Museum was created honouring both him and the company. A small monument at the airfield is also dedicated to them.
 In Gyeonggi-do, South Korea, and Hakone, Japan, theme village museums have been created honouring Saint-Exupéry's Little Prince.
 In January 1995, the Alberta Aviation Museum of Edmonton, Alberta, Canada, in conjunction with the cultural organization Alliance française, presented a showing of Saint-Exupéry letters, watercolours, sketches and photographs.
 In São Paulo, Brazil, through 2009, the Oca Art Exhibition Centre presented Saint-Exupéry and The Little Prince as part of The Year of France and The Little Prince. The displays covered over 10,000 m2 on four floors, and chronicled Saint-Exupéry, The Little Prince and their philosophies, as visitors passed through theme areas of the desert, asteroids, stars, and the cosmos. The ground floor of the giant exhibition was laid out as a huge map of the routes flown by the author with Aeropostale in South America and around the world. Also included was a full-scale replica of the author's crashed Caudron Simoun, lying wrecked on the ground of a simulated Libyan desert following his disastrous Paris-Saigon race attempt. The miraculous survival of Saint-Exupéry and his mechanic/navigator was subsequently chronicled in the award-winning memoir Wind, Sand and Stars (Terre des hommes), and also formed the introduction of his most famous work The Little Prince (Le Petit Prince).
 In 2011, the City of Toulouse, France, home of Airbus and the pioneering airmail carrier Aéropostale, in conjunction with the Estate of Saint-Exupéry-d'Agay and the Youth Foundation of Antoine de Saint-Exupéry, hosted a major exposition on Saint-Exupéry and his experience with Aéropostale. The exposition, titled L'année Antoine de Saint-Exupéry à Toulouse, exhibited selected personal artifacts of the author-aviator, including gloves, photos, posters, maps, manuscripts, drawings, models of the aircraft he flew, some of the wreckage from his Sahara Desert plane crash, and the personal silver identification bracelet engraved with his and Consuelo's name, presented by his U.S. publisher, which was recovered from his last, ultimate crash site in the Mediterranean Sea.
 On 27 February 2012, Russia's Ulyanovsk State University inaugurated its new International Saint-Exupéry Centre, led by its Director, Elena Mironova, an associate professor of French. The center will serve as a permanent museum dedicated to the author-aviator, as well as a cultural and linguistics center for the university. The museum was established with the assistance of Civil Aviation College teacher Nikolai Yatsenko, an author of 12 publications on Saint-Exupéry who personally donated some 6,000 related items. Located in Ulyanovsk, the university's new center will also help support the study of international languages in a city which promotes itself as a major aerospace and cultural centre. The centre's opening was attended by Ulyanovsk Governor Sergey Morozov, Sergey Krasnov of the Ulyanovsk Civil Aviation College and other aerospace and academic dignitaries, as well as Veronique Jober, Sorbonne professor of Slavic languages, who addressed the audience by video link from Paris.
 A number of other prominent exhibitions were created in France and the United States, many of them in 2000, honouring the centenary of the author-aviator's birth.
 In January 2014, New York City's Morgan Library & Museum featured a major three-month-long exhibition, The Little Prince: A New York Story. Celebrating the 70th anniversary year of the novella's publication, its exhibits included many of Saint-Exupéry's original manuscript pages, his story's preliminary drawings and watercolor paintings, and also examined Saint-Exupéry's creative writing processes.

International
 Saint-Exupéry's 1939 memoir Terre des hommes (titled as Wind, Sand and Stars in English) was chosen to create the central theme (Terre des Hommes–Man and His World) of the 1967 International and Universal Exposition in Montreal, Quebec, Canada (Expo '67), the most successful world's fair of the 20th century. The central theme, which also generated the 17 subsidiary elements used for the world's fair, was elucidated at a 1963 Montebello, Quebec, conference held with some of Canada's leading thinkers. At Montebello, French-Canadian author Gabrielle Roy helped choose the central theme by quoting Saint-Exupéry on mankind's place in the universe:

Additionally, Michèle Lalonde and André Prévost's oratorio Terre des hommes, performed at the Place des Nations opening ceremonies and attended by the international delegates of the participating countries, strongly projected the French writer's 'idealist rhetoric'. Consuelo de Saint Exupéry (1901–1979), his widow, was also a guest of honour at the opening ceremonies of the world's fair.
 Asteroid 2578 Saint-Exupéry, discovered in November 1975 by Russian astronomer Tamara Smirnova and provisionally cataloged as Asteroid 1975 VW3, was renamed in the author-aviator's honour. Another asteroid was named as 46610 Bésixdouze (translated to and from both hexadecimal and French as 'B612'). Additionally the terrestrial-asteroid protection organization B612 Foundation was named in tribute to the author's Little Prince, who fell to Earth from Asteroid B-612.
 Philatelic tributes have been printed in at least 25 other countries . Only three years after his death, the pilot-aviator was first featured on an 8 franc French West Africa airmail stamp (Scott Catalog # C11). France followed several months later in 1948 with an 80 franc airmail stamp honouring him (CB1), and later with another stamp honouring both him and airmail pioneer Jean Mermoz, plus the supersonic Concorde passenger airliner, in 1970 (C43). In commemoration of the 50th anniversary of the writer's death, Israel issued a stamp honoring "Saint-Ex" and The Little Prince in 1994.
 In Argentina and Brazil, where Saint-Exupéry became the founding director of the pioneering South American airmail airline Aeroposta Argentina:
 the Aguja Saint Exupery is a mountain peak located near the Cerro Chaltén (also known as Monte Fitz Roy) in the Los Glaciares National Park in Patagonia, Argentina, The mountain peak is named in Saint-Exupéry's honour;
 the San Antonio Oeste municipal airport was named Aerodromo Saint Exupery. A small museum exhibit resides in the airport building;
 the small Brazilian airport serving Ocauçu, São Paulo is named after the pilot, and
 several Argentinian schools are also named after the author-aviator.

Institutions and schools
 In 1960 the humanitarian organization Terre des hommes, named after Saint-Exupéry's 1939 philosophical memoir Terre des hommes (titled as Wind, Sand and Stars in English), was founded in Lausanne, Switzerland by Edmond Kaiser. Other Terre des Hommes societies were later organized in more countries with similar social aid and humanitarian goals. The several independent groups joined to form a new umbrella organization, Terre des Hommes-Fédération Internationale (TDHFI, in English: International Federation of Terre des Hommes, or IFTDH). The national constituents first met in 1966 to formalize their new parent organization, headquartered in Geneva, Switzerland.  eleven organizations in Canada, Denmark, Germany, France, Italy, Luxembourg, the Netherlands, Spain, Switzerland, and Syria belonged to the Federation. An important part of their works is their consulting role to the United Nations Economic and Social Council (ECOSOC).
 In June 2009, the Antoine de Saint-Exupéry Youth Foundation (FASEJ) was founded in Paris by the Saint-Exupéry–d'Agay Estate, to promote education, art, culture, health and sports for youth worldwide, especially those from disadvantaged backgrounds. This organization, which follows Saint-Exupéry's philosophies and his memory, was financed in part by the sale of one of his original 1936 handwritten manuscripts at a Sotheby's auction for €312,750.
 Numerous public schools, lycées, high schools, colleges and technical schools have been named in honour of Saint-Exupéry across France, Europe, Québec and South America, as well as at least two in Africa. The École Antoine de Saint-Exupéry de Kigali, a French international school in Rwanda, is named after him, as is École Francaise Antoine de Saint-Exupéry in Saint Louis, Senegal

Other
Numerous other tributes have been awarded to honour Saint-Exupéry and his most famous literary creation, his Little Prince:
 The GR I/33 (later renamed as the 1/33 Belfort Squadron), one of the French Air Force squadrons Saint-Exupéry flew with, adopted the image of the Little Prince as part of the squadron and tail insignia on its Dassault Mirage fighter jets.
 Google celebrated Saint-Exupéry's 110th birthday with a special logotype depicting the little prince being hoisted through the heavens by a flock of birds.
 Numerous streets and place names are named after the author-aviator throughout France and other countries.
 Cafe Saint-Ex, a popular bar and nightclub in Washington, D.C. near the U-Street corridor, holds Saint-Exupéry as its name source.
 Uruguayan airline BQB Líneas Aéreas named one of its aircraft, an ATR-72 (CX-JPL), in honor of the aviator.
 International Watch Company (IWC) has created many St Exupery tribute versions of several of their wristwatch lines, with the distinctive 'A' from his signature featured on the dial.
 The American aviation magazine Flying ranked Saint-Exupéry number 41 on their list of the "51 Heroes of Aviation".
The French 50 Franc banknote depicted Antoine de Saint-Exupéry and had several features that allude to his works.
The new flagship of CMA CGM Group for celebrating her 40th Anniversary, takes the name of Antoine de Saint-Exupéry to commemorate his achievement.

In popular culture

Film
 Wings of Courage is a 1995 docudrama by French director Jean-Jacques Annaud. The movie was the world's first dramatic picture shot in the IMAX-format and is an account of the true story of early airmail pilots Henri Guillaumet (played by Craig Sheffer), Saint-Exupéry played by Tom Hulce, and several others.
 Saint-Exupéry and his wife Consuelo were portrayed by Bruno Ganz and Miranda Richardson in the 1997 biopic Saint-Ex, a British film biography of the French author-pilot. It also featured Eleanor Bron and was filmed and distributed in the United Kingdom, with scripting by Frank Cottrell Boyce. The film combines elements of biography, documentary, and dramatic licence.

Literature
 After his disappearance, Consuelo de Saint Exupéry wrote The Tale of the Rose, which was published in 2000 and subsequently translated into 16 languages.
 Saint-Exupéry is mentioned in Tom Wolfe's The Right Stuff: "A saint in short, true to his name, flying up here at the right hand of God. The good Saint-Ex! And he was not the only one. He was merely the one who put it into words most beautifully and anointed himself before the altar of the right stuff."
 Comic-book author Hugo Pratt imagined the fantastic story of Saint-Exupéry's last flight in Saint-Exupéry: le dernier vol (1994).
 Saint-Exupéry is the subject of the 2013 historical novel Studio Saint-Ex (Knopf, New York / Penguin, Canada) by Ania Szado. In the novel Saint-Exupéry awaits the Americans' entry into World War II, while writing The Little Prince in New York.
 Wind, Sand and Stars is an important book to narrator Theo Decker, who re-reads it often, in The Goldfinch (2013) by Donna Tartt.
 Saint-Exupéry was the principal character in Antonio Iturbe's 2017 Spanish language novel A cielo abierto which was translated into English and published in 2021 with the title The Prince of the Skies.

Music
 Saint-Exupéry's death and speculation that Horst Rippert shot him down are the subject of "Saint Ex", a song on Widespread Panic's eleventh studio album, Dirty Side Down.
 "P 38", a 1983 song by the Swedish pop band Webstrarna took inspiration from Saint-Ex disappearance in July 1944. 
 The Norwegian progressive rock band Gazpacho's concept album Tick Tock is based on Saint-Exupéry's desert crash.
 "On the Planet of the Living", a song sung by Eduard Khil, was dedicated to Saint-Exupéry.
 "St. Exupéry Blues" – a song by Russian folk-rock band Melnitsa from their album "Alchemy"

Theatre
In August 2011, Saint-Ex, a theatrical production of Saint-Exupéry's life, premiered in Weston, Vermont.

See also
 List of people who disappeared

General
 Consuelo de Saint Exupéry, wife of Saint-Exupéry
 Indexed listing of Wikipedia's Saint-Exupéry articles

Literary works in English
 The Aviator
 Southern mail
 Night Flight
 Wind, Sand and Stars
 Flight to Arras
 The Little Prince
 A Sense of Life

Media and popular culture
 List of The Little Prince adaptations
 Saint-Ex, a 1997 British biopic

Notes

References

Citations
{{Reflist
|refs =

<ref name=Ibert>Ibert, Jean-Claude. Antoine de Saint-Exupéry: Classiques de XXe Siècle. Paris: Éditions Universitaires, 1953, p. 123.</ref>

}}

Sources
 
 Berton, Pierre. 1967: The Last Good Year. Toronto: Doubleday Canada, 1997. .
 
 
 
 
 
 
 
 
 
 
 
 
 La Gazette des Français du Paraguay Antoine de Saint-Exupéry, Vol de nuit 1931, Vaincre l'impossible – Antoine de Saint-Exupéry, Vuelo nocturno 1931, Superar lo desconocido bilingue, numéro 14 année II, Assomption, Paraguay.
 

Further reading
Selected biographies
 Chevrier, Pierre (pseudonym of Hélène (Nelly) de Vogüé). Antoine de Saint-Exupéry. Montreal, Quebec, Canada: La librairie Gallimard de Montréal, 1950.
 Migeo, Marcel. Saint-Exupéry. New York: McGraw-Hill, (trans. 1961), 1960.
 Peyre, Henri. French Novelists of Today. New York: Oxford UP, 1967.
 Robinson, Joy D. Marie. Antoine de Saint Exupéry (Twayne's World Authors series: French literature). Boston: Twayne Publishers, 1984, pp. 120–142.
 Rumbold, Richard and Lady Margaret Stewart. The Winged Life: A Portrait of Antoine de Saint-Exupéry, Poet and Airman. New York: D. McKay, 1955.
 Smith, Maxwell A. Knight of the Air: The Life and Works of Antoine de Saint-Exupéry''. New York: Pageant Press, 1956.

External links

 
 Antoine de Saint-Exupéry (society) (official website) 
 Antoine de Saint-Exupéry Youth Foundation (F-ASEJ) (official website) 
 2011 Année Antoine de Saint-Exupéry Toulouse celebration of Saint-Exupéry in 2011 
 Major bibliography of French and English biographical works on Saint-Exupéry
 A website dedicated to the Centennial Anniversary of Antoine and Consuelo de Saint-Exupéry
 The Luftwaffe and Saint-Exupéry: the evidence (in the website "Ghost Bombers")

 Antoine de Saint-Exupéry
1900 births
1940s missing person cases
1944 deaths
20th-century French novelists
20th-century French journalists
20th-century memoirists
Writers from Lyon
French emigrants to Argentina
French expatriates in Argentina
French expatriates in the United States
Aerial photographers
Aviation writers
Aviators killed in aviation accidents or incidents
Chevaliers of the Légion d'honneur
Counts of France
Existentialists
Free French military personnel of World War II
French Air and Space Force personnel
French Army officers
French aviators
French children's writers
French fantasy writers
French male poets
French memoirists
French military personnel killed in World War II
French Roman Catholics
French World War II pilots
Grand Prix du roman de l'Académie française winners
Hugo Award-winning writers
Lycée Saint-Louis alumni
Missing aviators
Missing in action of World War II
Modernist writers
National Book Award winners
Prix Femina winners
Recipients of the Croix de Guerre 1939–1945 (France)
Reconnaissance pilots
Victims of aviation accidents or incidents in 1944
Writers who illustrated their own writing